The Twist is a 1976 film co-written and directed by Claude Chabrol. Its title in French is Folies bourgeoises (literally - bourgeois madness).

Plot

The film follows a bored, upper class group of Parisians who embark on a series of affairs with each other.

Principal cast

Critical reception
Glenn Davidson of Turner Classic Movies:

Michael Barrett of PopMatters:

References

External links 

1976 films
1970s sex comedy films
Adultery in films
Films about writers
Films based on French novels
Films directed by Claude Chabrol
Films scored by Manuel De Sica
Films shot in Paris
Italian sex comedy films
West German films
French sex comedy films
English-language French films
English-language German films
English-language Italian films
1976 comedy films
Films produced by Pierre Spengler
1970s French films
1970s Italian films